|}

The Paddy Power Future Champions Novice Hurdle is a Grade 1 National Hunt race in Ireland. It is run at Leopardstown Racecourse at the end of December during the Christmas Festival, over a distance of about 2 miles (3,219 metres) and during its running there are 8 hurdles to be jumped.

The race was originally run over 2 miles and 2 furlongs, before being reduced to its present distance in 1997. It was awarded Grade 1 status in 2008 and is seen as a key race prior to the Cheltenham Festival in March. The race is currently sponsored by the Paddy Power bookmaking company.

Records
Most successful jockey (4 wins):
 Paul Townend -  Hurricane Fly (2008), Saturnas (2016), Appreciate It (2020), Facile Vega (2022)

Most successful trainer (7 wins): 
 Willie Mullins –  Hurricane Fly (2008), Long Dog (2015), Saturnas (2016), Whiskey Sour (2018), Aramon (2018), Appreciate It (2020), Facile Vega (2022)

Recent Winners

See also
 Horse racing in Ireland
 List of Irish National Hunt races

References
Racing Post:

National Hunt races in Ireland
National Hunt hurdle races
Leopardstown Racecourse